Castilla is an administrative neighborhood of Madrid belonging to the district of Chamartín.

Wards of Madrid
Chamartín (Madrid)